Oya Dam  is a rockfill dam located in Ishikawa Prefecture in Japan. The dam is used for flood control and water supply. The catchment area of the dam is 12.8 km2. The dam impounds about 24  ha of land when full and can store 3050 thousand cubic meters of water. The construction of the dam was started on 1973 and completed in 1992.

See also
List of dams in Japan

References

Dams in Ishikawa Prefecture